Griffith Island lies within the Arctic Archipelago in the Qikiqtaaluk Region of northern Canada's territory of Nunavut. It is one of the mid-channel islands in the western sector of Barrow Strait.

Captain Horatio Austin, on board the ship Resolute and seeking the lost Sir John Franklin expedition, wintered off Griffith Island in 1851. Explorations that winter by second master, George F. McDougall, included McDougall Sound, the waterway to the north of Griffith Island.

Since 1958, the southeast coast of Griffith Island has experienced uncommon change, from discontinuous flying spits to continuous fringing barriers.

On April 25, 2021, a Great Slave Helicopters owned helicopter that was surveying polar bear populations crashed on Griffith Island, killing all three on board.

References

Further reading

External links 
 Aerial photo, August 1965
 Griffith Island in the Atlas of Canada - Toporama; Natural Resources Canada

Islands of the Queen Elizabeth Islands
Uninhabited islands of Qikiqtaaluk Region